Maria Franklin is an associate professor at the University of Texas at Austin. She is a historical archaeologist whose work includes black-feminist theory, African Diaspora studies and race and gender.

Education 
She received her PhD in 1997 from Berkeley.

Career 
Franklin is an assistant professor at the University of Texas, where she has a joint appointment in the Department of Anthropology and the Center for African and African-American Studies. Her research includes work on plantation-related sites in the Chesapeake at  Colonial Williamsburg, and foodways in African American households in Texas.

From 2010-2013 she sat on the board of directors of the Society for Historical Archaeology.

She is a member of the editorial board for American Antiquity.

Selected publications 
Franklin, M. 1997. “Power to the people”: sociopolitics and the archaeology of black Americans. Historical Archaeology 31(3), 36-50.

Franklin, M. 2001. A Black feminist-inspired archaeology? Journal of Social Archaeology 1(1), 108-125.

Franklin, M. and McKee, L. 2004. African Diaspora Archaeologies: Present Insights and Expanding Discourses. Historical Archaeology 38(1):1-9.

Franklin, M. 2004 An Archaeological Study of the Rich Neck Slave Quarter and Enslaved Domestic Life. Colonial Williamsburg Research Publications. Dietz Press, Richmond, VA.

Franklin, M., & Lee, N. 2019. Revitalizing Tradition and Instigating Change: Foodways at the Ransom and Sarah Williams Farmstead, c. 1871–1905. Journal of African Diaspora Archaeology and Heritage 8(3), 202-225.

Franklin, M. 2020. Enslaved Household Variability and Plantation Life and Labor in Colonial Virginia. International Journal of Historical Archaeology 24(1), 115-155.

Franklin, M., & Lee, N. 2020. African American descendants, community outreach, and the Ransom and Sarah Williams Farmstead Project. Journal of Community Archaeology & Heritage 7(2), 135-148.

References 

Historical archaeologists
American women archaeologists
University of Texas at Austin faculty
Year of birth missing (living people)
Living people
University of California, Berkeley alumni
American women academics
21st-century American women